"Wrongs Darker Than Death or Night" is the 141st episode of the science fiction television series Star Trek: Deep Space Nine, the 17th episode of the sixth season.

Set in the 24th century, the series takes place on Deep Space Nine, a fictional space station near the planet Bajor, as the Bajorans recover from a brutal decades-long occupation by the Cardassians. In this episode, Gul Dukat, the Cardassian former prefect of Bajor, tells Major Kira Nerys, a Bajoran, that her mother was once his lover, and Kira time-travels to the days of the occupation in order to find the truth.

This episode had Nielsen ratings of 4.6 when it was broadcast in 1998, which equates to about 4.5 million viewers.

Casting
Leslie Hope guest-stars as Kira Meru, and Marc Alaimo returns in his recurring role as Dukat. Other guest actors include David Bowe as Basso Tromac, Wayne Grace as Legate Parek, Tim deZarn as Halb Daier, and Thomas Kopache as Kira Taban.

Plot
On her late mother Meru's 60th birthday, Major Kira Nerys receives a transmission from Gul Dukat; he tells her that Meru was his lover for many years and had left her family to be with him. Major Kira obtains station commander Captain Sisko's permission to consult the Bajoran Orb of Time to find out the truth. The Orb sends her to the past, to a refugee center where her family once lived. There she befriends Meru, using the name "Luma Rahl".

"Luma" and Meru are taken from the camp to become "comfort women" for Cardassian troops. The women are taken to the new space station Terok Nor—the future Deep Space Nine. There, despite her sadness, Meru is overwhelmed by the bounty of food and other comforts. She confesses to Nerys that she has what she always dreamed of — good health, beautiful clothes, enough to eat — but at the cost of her family. Gul Dukat singles Meru out for special attention, and she eventually becomes Dukat's mistress. When Nerys confronts a guard and demands to see Meru, she is thrown out into the station's Bajoran ghetto. There Halb, a member of the Bajoran resistance, asks her to help attack the Cardassians.

The next time Nerys sees her mother, Meru praises Dukat, and it is too much for Nerys to bear. She angrily reminds Meru that Dukat is not only responsible for killing innocent Bajorans, but also for separating her from her family. Meru explains that Dukat has promised to provide her husband and children with food and medical supplies. Nerys accuses Meru of becoming a collaborator and storms out, hatching a plan with Halb to smuggle a bomb into Dukat's quarters. Her mother could be killed in the blast, but Nerys no longer cares.

Pretending to have had a change of heart, Nerys returns to Dukat's quarters to apologize to Meru, then secretly hides the bomb. She is preparing to leave when Meru receives a message from her husband Taban. He thanks his wife for what she has done, telling her that she has saved their lives. Nerys suddenly warns Dukat and Meru about the bomb, and they escape just before it detonates. Major Kira returns to the present with the painful knowledge that Dukat's story is true, and that the line between being a good person and a collaborator is not so clear-cut.

Episode Title 
The title of the show was developed by Hans Beimler, and it was meant to contrast with prior titles.

The phrase is in a passage in Prometheus Unbound by Percy Bysshe Shelley, a drama published in 1820.

Connections to other episodes
The Orb of Time was introduced in the fifth season's episode "Trials and Tribble-ations" (airdate November 4, 1996 / S5E6)

The second season's "Necessary Evil" and the fifth season's "Things Past" also portrayed life on the station during the occupation; the latter episode also shows Dukat taking interest in a Bajoran woman.

Reception
Tor.com gave the episode a 7 out of 10 rating. 

"Wrongs..." was rated 6th in a review of the darkest themed Deep Space Nine episodes. In 2018, SyFy recommend this episode for its abbreviated watch guide for the Bajoran character Kira Nerys.

References

External links

 

1998 American television episodes
Star Trek: Deep Space Nine (season 6) episodes
Star Trek time travel episodes
Television episodes about time travel